Oak Park station may refer to:

 Oak Park railway station, Melbourne, Victoria, Australia
 Oak Park, Illinois, United States
 Oak Park station (CTA Blue Line)
 Oak Park station (CTA Green Line)
 Oak Park station (Metra)